Asia Airways was a Tajik airline based in Dushanbe, Tajikistan. The airline provided cargo and passenger services between Tajikistan and countries such as Afghanistan, India, China, United Arab Emirates and Iran at September 2010. It ceased operations in 2015.

Fleet

The Asia Airways fleet consisted of the following aircraft:

The airline fleet previously included the following aircraft (as of September 2014):
 1 further Antonov An-12

References

Defunct airlines of Tajikistan
Airlines established in 2007
Airlines disestablished in 2015